2017 K League may refer to:

 2017 K League Classic (1st Division)
 2017 K League Challenge (2nd Division)